Baraigram ( or Boraaigraam) is an upazila of Natore District in Rajshahi Division, Bangladesh.

Geography
It has 40582 households and total area 299.61 km2. The upazila is bounded by Gurudaspur and Natore sadar upazilas on the north, Atgharia and Ishwardi upazilas on the south, Chatmohar upazila on the east, lalpur and Bagatipara upazilas on the west.

Demographics
According to the 2001 Bangladesh census, Baraigram had a population of 244821; male constituted 125399, female 119422; Muslim constituted 228205, Hindu 10296, Buddhist 6290, Christian 13 and others 17. Indigenous communities such as Pahari, Munda, Oraon, Mahato belong to this upazila.

As of the 1991 Bangladesh census, the upazila had a population of 230480. Males constituted 50.85% of the population, and females 49.15%. This Upazila's eighteen up population is 108842. Baraigram had an average literacy rate of 25.3% (7+ years), and the national average of 32.4% literate.

Administration
Baraigram, primarily formed as a Thana in 1869, was turned into an upazila on in 1983.

The Upazila is divided into Baraigram Municipality, Bonpara Municipality, and seven union parishads: Baraigram, Chandai, Gopalpur, Joari, Majgoan, Nagor, and Zonail. The union parishads are subdivided into 152 mauzas and 169 villages.

Baraigram Municipality and Bonpara Municipality are each subdivided into 9 wards.

See also
Upazilas of Bangladesh
Districts of Bangladesh
Divisions of Bangladesh

References

Upazilas of Natore District